Al-Masahrah is a sub-district located in At Taffah District, Al Bayda Governorate, Yemen.  Al-Masahrah had a population of 1913 according to the 2004 census.

References 

Sub-districts in At Taffah District